Desi Jews are Jews living in South Asia (or originally from this region, also known as the Indian subcontinent) who belong to communities that had been integrated into South Asian culture and society.

The term Desi, found in most South Asian languages, is used by the South Asians to refer to themselves. It means "one of us, of our land", alluding to a common culture (the opposite is Paradesi or Videshi aka non-Desi, "foreigner", see Paradesi Jews). After the 1947 partition, the term is also employed when it is intended to avoid any allusion to the specific state of origin, also when the topic involves all the Indian subcontinent. Many outsiders tend to indiscriminately use the word "Indian" for South Asian people and culture. This might be considered offensive by non-Indian Desi (the state of India is just a part of the Indian subcontinent).

Unlike other areas of the world, the Jewish communities were accepted and integrated in the local society of the Indian subcontinent. Also, similar to the Parsis, and other (originally) foreign communities, the preservation of group identity was facilitated by the caste system. In Desi society, a person's allegiance to a group, part of its fabric, is presumed and respected.

The Desi Jewish communities are some of the oldest in world, with more than 2000 years of continuity in the Indian subcontinent (such as the Cochin Jews and the Bene Israel). Most of them lived on the coast of the Arabian Sea. They were involved in trade in the Malabar area, also in the production of oil. A turning point was the arrival of the Portuguese in the 16th century. They introduced the Inquisition on the west coast of the Indian subcontinent, persecuting the Jewish and Christian communities. The arrival of the Europeans facilitated the immigration of Jews with Sephardi and Mizrahi backgrounds. In the times of the British Raj the arrival of the Sephardim and Mizrahim who were to be considered "Europeans" by the British authority, hence their name of Paradesi Jews ("White Jews") created some friction with the shunned older Desi communities.

After the mid-20th century, when the Indian subcontinent was partitioned and Israel was created, most Desi Jews emigrated mainly to Israel.

See also 
 Cochin Jews
 Bene Israel
 Baghdadi Jews
 Bnei Menashe
 Bene Ephraim
 Knanaya
 Judeo-Malayalam
 Judæo-Marathi
 Pakistani Jews

References 
 Dicţionar enciclopedic de iudaism, Editura Hasefer, București, 2000,

External links 
 Emigrants in New York
 Who Are the Jews of India?
 Jews of India
 Large collection of quotes by Hindu philosophers and writers against Anti-Semitism

 
Jews and Judaism in India
Jews and Judaism in Pakistan
Pakistani Jews
South Asian Jews